This list of SIP software documents notable software applications which use Session Initiation Protocol (SIP) as a voice over IP (VoIP) protocol.

Servers

Free and open-source license 
A SIP server, also known as a SIP proxy, manages all SIP calls within a network and takes responsibility for receiving requests from user agents for the purpose of placing and terminating calls.
 Asterisk
 Cipango SipServlets 1.1 application server
 ejabberd
 FreeSWITCH
 FreePBX
 GNU SIP Witch
 Issabel, fork of Elastix 
 Kamailio, formerly OpenSER
 Mobicents Platform (JSLEE[2] 1.0 compliant and SIP Servlets 1.1 compliant application server)
 Mysipswitch
 OpenSIPS, fork of OpenSER
 SailFin
 SIP Express Router (SER)
 Enterprise Communications System sipXecs
 Yate

Proprietary license 
 3Com VCX IP telephony module: back-to-back user agent SIP PBX
 3CX Phone System, for Windows, Debian 8 GNU/Linux
 Aastra 5000, 800, MX-ONE
 Alcatel-Lucent 5060 IP Call server
 Aricent SIP UA stack, B2BUA, proxy, VoLTE/RCS Client
 AskoziaPBX
 Avaya Application Server 5300 (AS5300), JITC certified ASSIP VoIP
 Bicom Systems IP PBX for telecoms
 Brekeke SIP Server, SIP proxy, SIP registrar, SIP NAT, TCP/UDP
 Brekeke PBX, SIP PBX for service providers and enterprises
 Cisco SIP Proxy Server, Cisco unified border element (CUBE), Cisco Unified Communication Manager (CUCM)
 CommuniGate Pro, virtualized PBX for IP Centrex hosting, voicemail services, self-care, ...
 Comverse Technology softswitch, media applications, SIP registrars
 Creacode SIP Application Server Real-time SIP call controller and IVR product for carrier-class VoIP networks
 Dialogic Corporation Powermedia Media Servers, audio and video SIP IVR, media and conferencing servers for Enterprise and Carriers.
 Dialexia VoIP Softswitches, IP PBX for medium and enterprise organizations, billing servers. 
 IBM WebSphere Application Server - Converged HTTP and SIP container JEE Application Server
 Interactive Intelligence Windows-based IP PBX for small, medium and enterprise organizations
 Kerio Operator,  IP PBX for small and medium enterprises
 Microsoft Lync Server 2010 & 2013
 Mitel Communications Director
 NEC SV7000 back-to-back user agent SIP PBX
 NEC UNIVERGE 3C Unified Communications and Collaboration software
 Nokia Siemens Networks hiQ8000
 Nortel SCS500
 Nortel SIP Multimedia Communication Server 5200
 Objectworld UC Server
 Oracle Communications Converged Application Server (OCCAS)
 Oracle WebLogic SIP Server
 Spirent SIP Server Platform
 ShoreTel IP phone systems with unified communications and contact center built in
 Snom One free/blue/yellow (Snom acquired and renamed pbxnsip) (SIP)
 Speedflow Communications VoIP class 4/5 softswitches with integrated billing, transcoding, SIP-H.323 converter.
 Sterlite Technologies Neox IPPBX, IMS - ISC, Dial Center - OmniChannel Call Center, IVR products
 Sun Microsystems Sun GlassFish Communication Server
 Tadiran Telecom Coral Ipx family and Aeonix softswitch
 Tandberg Video Communication Server - SIP application server, media server and H.323 gateway
 Unify OpenScape Voice, OpenScape 8000 SIP softswitch, mediaserver, ... (SIP)
 Voice Elements Inventive Labs' .NET Voice Development software and SIP stack platform.
 Zultys MX250/MX30 IP PBXs for SMB and enterprise

Clients

Free and open-source license 
Jami, with GTK/Qt GUI, also supports IAX2 protocol, for Linux, OS X, Windows GPL
 Jitsi, a Java VoIP and Instant Messaging client with ZRTP encryption, for FreeBSD, Linux, OS X, Windows; LGPL
 Linphone, with a core/UI separation, the GUI is using GTK libraries, for Linux, OS X, Windows, and mobile phones (Android, iPhone, Windows Phone, BlackBerry)
 MicroSIP, lightweight softphone, using PJSIP stack, for Windows
 Telephone, OS X softphone written in Cocoa/Swift
 Twinkle, using Qt libraries, GPL, for Linux
 Yate client, using Qt libraries, GPL

Proprietary license 
 Blink, for Mac
 Librestream's 2500 Camera, 5000HD camera, Onsight Cube (wearable/modular camera), Onsight Connect (Windows, iOS, Android).
LifeSize Desktop, for Windows
 Phoner and PhonerLite, for Windows, Voice: G.711, G.722, G.726, GSM, iLBC, Speex, Opus; security: TLS, SRTP, ZRTP
 Polycom PVX, for Windows. Voice: G.711, G.722, G.722.1, G.728, G.729A, Siren Codec; Video: H.261, H.263, H.264; Data: T.120, People+ Content, H.239, H.323 Annex Q far-end camera control
 Windows Messenger versions 4 and 5 (not to be confused with Windows Live Messenger or MSN Messenger which do not support SIP)

Discontinued 
 QuteCom, formerly named OpenWengo, using Qt libraries, GPL, for Windows, Mac, and RPM- DEB-based Linux, discontinued in 2016
 Gizmo5, formerly PhoneGaim, discontinued in 2011
Empathy, using GTK libraries and Telepathy framework, GPL, discontinued in earliest visible, 2021.

Mobile clients

Free and open-source license 
 Jami for Android, iOS; GPL v3
 Linphone for Android, BlackBerry, iPhone, Windows phone; GPL v2
 Sipdroid for Android, GPL v3

Proprietary license 
 Acrobits for iOS and Android

Discontinued 
 CSipSimple for Android, GPL v3, discontinued in 2019

Session border controllers 

 Acme Packet Session Director
 Audiocodes Mediant
 Genband Quantix SBC
 Ingate Systems Ingate SIParators
 Metaswitch Perimeta
 Kamailio

Enabled firewalls 
 Check Point VPN-1 firewalls, include complete SIP support for multiple vendors
 The firewall feature in Cisco IOS includes complete SIP support
 Cisco PIX/ASA firewalls include complete SIP support
 D-Link Firewall DFL-210/260/800/860/1600/2500 supports SIP (SIP-ALG) with firmware 2.20.01.05 and above
 Fortinet, all FortiGates running v280/v300 builds
 Intertex SIP transparent routers, firewalls and ADSL modems, for broadband deployments and SOHO market
 Juniper Networks Netscreen and SRX firewalls include complete SIP Application Layer Gateway support
 Linux Netfilter's SIP conntrack helper fully understands SIP and can classify (for QOS) and NAT all related traffic
 Netopia Netopia supports ALG
 PF, built-in OpenBSD firewall PF can handle the NAT through the "static-port" directive and the bandwidth control through the built-in queuing system of SIP connections
 pfSense, a firewall/router distribution based on FreeBSD and PF; has QoS that properly tags VoIP traffic and a SIP proxy package that is available for NATed endpoints. Its functionality can be expanded with packages like FreeSWITCH, a free/open source software communications platform for making SIP, voice and chat driven products.
 Secure Computing, SnapGear firewall includes siproxd SIP proxy, Sidewinder 7 firewall includes a SIP proxy
 SonicWall, supports SIP
 ZyXEL ZyWALL P1, 2Plus, 5 UTM, 35 UTM, 70 UTM, 1050, USG 100, USG 200, USG 300, USG 1000 supports SIP-ALG

Libraries 
 oSIP

Test tools 
 Codenomicon Defensics: commercial test automation framework
 Ixia (company) commercial SIP-VoIP and Video test and emulation and load test platform
 Mu Dynamics: commercial SIP-VoIP, RTSP-IPTV Triple Play service assurance platform

See also 
 Comparison of VoIP software
 List of video telecommunication services and product brands
 Mobile VoIP

References

External links 
 

Lists of software
VoIP software
Videotelephony